Arilla is a white Italian wine grape variety that is grown on the island of Ischia in the Tyrrhenian Sea near the Gulf of Naples. However, despite being exclusively found on the island, ampelographers believe that the grape may have actually originated in Sicily.

Today, Arilla is noted for its very high yields of grapes that produces relatively neutral tasting wine that is often blended with other local Italian grape varieties such as Biancolella, Forastera and San Lunardo.

History

Though Arilla has a long history of production on the island of Ischia, near the city of Naples, ampelographers believe that the grape is not actually native to Ischia or Campania but rather originated on the island of Sicily.

Viticulture
Arilla thrives on the volcanic vineyard soils of the south-facing slopes of the island of Ischia.

Wine regions

Today, the grape is found almost exclusively on the island of Ischia where it produces relatively neutral wines that are often blended with other local grape varieties including Biancolella, Forastera and San Lunardo.

Synonyms
Over the years, Arilla has been known under a variety of synonyms including: Agrilla, Arillo, Rille and Uva Rilla.

References

White wine grape varieties